KMF is the fourth studio album by Norwegian indie rock band Kakkmaddafakka. It was released on March 18, 2016.

Track listing
"Galapagos" – 3:15
"May God" – 3:26
"Young You" – 3:40
"Change" – 3:22
"30 Days" – 3:24
"Fool" – 4:10
"No Cure" – 3:50
"Language" – 2:56
"Lilac" – 3:12
"Superwoman" – 2:38
"True" – 3:11
"Empty Streets" – 3:03

References

Kakkmaddafakka albums
2016 albums